George Lewis Luker, (1841-1902) was an English painter and architect.

Life and work

George Lewis Luker was born in Oxford in 1845. He was trained as an architect but developed into a very talented watercolour landscape painter. During the 1880s he was based in London, then Milford, Surrey by 1887 before relocating to No.10 New Inn, Westminster, London before and at the time of his death on 3 February 1902. He had at death low assets — publicly sworn (in probate) by his executrix, the wife of Thomas William Allen, at £46 13s. 6d.

Exhibitions

He exhibited prolifically at all the major exhibitions including:

The Royal Society of Artists, Birmingham
The Dudley Gallery and New Dudley Gallery
Glasgow Institute of Fine Arts
Walker Art Gallery, Liverpool
Manchester City Art Gallery
The Royal Academy, London
Royal Society of British Artists
The Royal Institute of Painters in Watercolours
Arthur Tooth and Sons Gallery

References

1841 births
1902 deaths
19th-century English painters
English male painters
Architects from Oxford
19th-century English male artists